The 2019 IIHF Women's World Championship was an international Ice hockey tournament run by the International Ice Hockey Federation. It was contested in Espoo, Finland from 4 to 14 April 2019 at the Espoo Metro Areena.

The United States won their fifth consecutive and ninth overall title after a shootout win over Finland. Canada claimed the bronze medal by defeating Russia 7–0.

After the 2017 tournament, it was announced that tournament would expand to ten teams for 2019, having been played with eight teams since the first tournament in 1990, except in 2004, 2007, 2008, and 2009, where nine teams played. The 2004 edition featured nine teams when Japan was promoted from Division II but no team was relegated from the top division in 2003, due to the cancellation of the top division tournament in China because of the outbreak of the SARS disease. Two teams were relegated from the top division in 2004, going back to eight teams for 2005, but due to the success of the 9-team pool in 2004, IIHF decided to expand again to nine teams for 2007. Reverting to eight teams after the 2009 tournament. To bring the tournament to ten teams, Czech Republic which had lost the 2017 Relegation Round, stayed in the top division. Joined by Division I Group A Champions, Japan (2017) and France (2018)

Venue

23 games were played in the main arena, while six games were played at a secondary rink.

Format
The ten teams were split into two groups according to their rankings. In Group A, all teams advanced to the quarterfinals and three teams from Group B advanced. The bottom two Group B teams were relegated. From the quarterfinals on, a knockout system was used.

Participants

Group A

 – Hosts

Group B

 – Promoted from Division I Group A in 2017

 – Promoted from Division I Group A in 2018

Match officials
12 referees and 10 linesmen are selected for the tournament.

Rosters

Each team's roster consists of at least 15 skaters (forwards, and defencemen) and 2 goaltenders, and at most 20 skaters and 3 goaltenders. All ten participating nations, through the confirmation of their respective national associations, had to submit a "Long List" roster no later than two weeks before the tournament.

Preliminary round
The schedule was released on 20 August 2018.

All times are local (UTC+3).

Group A

Group B

Knockout stage

Bracket

Ninth place game

Quarterfinals

Semifinals

Bronze medal game

Final

Controversy
During the final between the United States and Finland, it appeared Finland had won 2–1 in overtime after a game-winning goal to win its first World Championship. However, Finland celebrated on the ice before the Video Goal Judge initiated a video review. The goal was reviewed for over ten minutes and eventually overturned. The IIHF released a press statement the next day citing rules 186 and 183ii as the reasons for overturning the goal. The United States went on to defeat Finland 2–1 in shootout. It was later announced that Finnish Ice Hockey Association would pay the Finnish team the bonus allotted for winning a gold medal, instead of the silver medal bonus.

Final standings

Awards and statistics

Awards
Best players selected by the directorate:
Best Goaltender:  Noora Räty
Best Defenceman:  Jenni Hiirikoski
Best Forward:  Kendall Coyne Schofield
Source: IIHF.com

All-star team
Goaltender:  Noora Räty
Defence:  Jenni Hiirikoski,  Cayla Barnes
Forwards:  Hilary Knight,  Kendall Coyne Schofield,  Michelle Karvinen
MVP:  Jenni Hiirikoski
Source: IIHF.com

Scoring leaders
List shows the top skaters sorted by points, then goals.

GP = Games played; G = Goals; A = Assists; Pts = Points; +/− = Plus/minus; PIM = Penalties in minutes; POS = Position
Source: IIHF.com

Leading goaltenders
Only the top five goaltenders, based on save percentage, who have played at least 40% of their team's minutes, are included in this list.

TOI = Time on Ice (minutes:seconds); SA = Shots against; GA = Goals against; GAA = Goals against average; Sv% = Save percentage; SO = Shutouts
Source: IIHF.com

References

External links
Official website

IIHF Women's World Championship
2019 IIHF Women's World Championship
IIHF Women's World Championship
IIHF Women's World Championship
IIHF Women's World Championship
Women's ice hockey competitions in Finland